The 2019–20 season was Sparta Rotterdam's 132nd season in existence and the club's first season in the top flight of Dutch football. In addition to the domestic league, Sparta Rotterdam participated in this season's edition of the KNVB Cup. The season covered the period from 1 July 2019 to 30 June 2020.

Players

Current squad

Reserve squad

Pre-season and friendlies

Competitions

Overview

Eredivisie

League table

Results summary

Results by round

Matches
The Eredivisie schedule was announced on 14 June 2019. The 2019–20 season was abandoned on 24 April 2020, due to the coronavirus pandemic in the Netherlands.

KNVB Cup

References

External links

Sparta Rotterdam seasons
Sparta Rotterdam